Ursula Parrott (March 26, 1899 – September 1957), was a commercially successful American writer of romantic fiction novels. Her first book, Ex-Wife (1929), was a best seller, and was adapted for film as The Divorcee, starring Norma Shearer. Exploring changing sexual mores and their implications for women, Ex-Wife was considered scandalous in its time. Between 1930 and 1936, Parrott sold the rights to eight more novels and stories that were made into films.

Personal life 
Ursula Parrott was born Katherine Ursula Towle in Dorchester, Massachusetts. She graduated from Radcliffe College, a small women's liberal arts college in Cambridge, Massachusetts. After graduation she moved to Greenwich Village, where she met Lindesay Marc Parrott in 1920.

In 1922, Ursula married Lindesay Marc Parrott, who at the time was a reporter for The New York Times. They had a son named Lindesay Marc Parrott Jr. two years later. However, his existence was kept a secret from her husband, as he never wanted to have a son. So, Ursula left the child in the custody of her father and sister and returned to Lindesay, still not speaking a word about the son. It was until 1924 that Lindesay found out that he was a father. As a result, he immediately divorced her, rejected the existence of his son, and never once went to see him. As for Ursula, she still saw her son often, brought him gifts, and eventually gave him a Harvard education.

Since the divorce, Ursula had married three other men, while she simultaneously continued to stay involved with her second husband: Charles T. Greenwood, a prominent New York banker, in 1934, John Wildberg, an attorney, in 1937, and Air Force Major Coster Schermerhorn in 1945. She was also rumored to have had affairs with F. Scott Fitzgerald and Sinclair Lewis.

Parrott died in New York in 1957 at the age of 58 due to cancer. She died in the charity ward of a New York City hospital.

Career
Parrott's first novel, Ex-Wife, was published anonymously in 1929. A popular sensation, it sold more than 100,000 copies in nine editions. MGM paid $20,000 for the film rights as well. Ex-Wife was subsequently adapted for film as The Divorcee (1930) starring Norma Shearer, who won an Oscar for her role. Shearer also starred in an adaptation of Strangers May Kiss, published in 1930. Her novel Next Time We Live was adapted for film as Next Time We Love in 1936. As a writer, Parrott was most successful between 1929 and 1940. Her son estimated that she earned around $700,000 ($ in  dollars) during that period of time.

In December 1942, Parrott became the subject of national coverage when she was brought up on federal charges of attempting to help the jazz guitarist Michael Neely Bryan escape from the Miami Beach Army stockade, but was found innocent by the jury at her trial.

See also
Next Time We Love
There's Always Tomorrow (1956 film)
The Divorcee
Strangers May Kiss
Love Affair (1932 film)

References

External links 

 
 
 Westall, Susan - The Development of a Bio-Bibliography for Ursula Parrott with Indexing and Navigation Tools in Printed and Web-Based Versions (Master's Research Paper, Kent State University) - Education Resources Information Center
 Ursula Parrott books.google.com

1899 births
1957 deaths
20th-century American novelists
20th-century American short story writers
20th-century American women writers
American women novelists
American women short story writers
Novelists from Massachusetts
Novelists from New York (state)
Radcliffe College alumni
Women romantic fiction writers
Writers from Boston
Writers from New York City